"The Way" is a song by American alternative rock band Fastball. It was released on January 7, 1998, as the lead single from their second studio album, All the Pain Money Can Buy (1998). The song was written by the band's lead vocalist, Tony Scalzo, and was produced by the band and Julian Raymond. Scalzo was inspired to write the song after reading about the disappearance of an elderly couple who were found dead in their car many miles away from their original destination.

"The Way" peaked at number one on the US Billboard Modern Rock Tracks chart in April 1998 and remained there for seven weeks. It also reached number one in Canada on the week of June 15, 1998, and topped the RPM Alternative 30 chart for four weeks. Worldwide, the song peaked at number seven in Sweden and entered the top 20 in Australia, Iceland, and Norway. The song was voted by VH1 as one of its "100 Greatest Songs of the '90s", ranking it at number 94.

Background and writing
Fastball frontman Tony Scalzo came up with the idea for the song after reading articles that described the June 1997 disappearance of an elderly married couple, Lela and Raymond Howard from Salado, Texas, who left home to attend the Pioneer Day festival at nearby Temple, Texas, despite Lela's Alzheimer's and Raymond recently recovering from brain surgery. They were discovered two weeks later, dead, at the bottom of a ravine near Hot Springs, Arkansas, hundreds of miles off their intended route. The authorities who investigated the accident believed that Lela, who was driving the car, was trying to locate a place where she had once vacationed.

Content
The song's lyrics revolve around an older married couple who decide to leave their life behind by packing their things and going driving, without telling their children about their plans. Their car breaks down during the trip, forcing them to continue on foot. The chorus expresses the idea that the couple are achieving happiness by losing touch with the world, even though they may never see their home again.

The beginning of the song features a radio scanning through FM stations. Most of the content heard is advertisements, and at one point, the radio tunes in while "Foolish Games" by Jewel is playing.

Track listings
UK 7-inch and cassette single; European CD single
 "The Way" (radio edit) – 4:08
 "Are You Ready for the Fallout?" – 3:15

UK, Australian, and Japanese CD single
 "The Way" (radio edit) – 4:08
 "Are You Ready for the Fallout?" – 3:15
 "Freeloader Freddy" – 3:09

Charts and certifications

Weekly charts

Year-end charts

Certifications

Release history

Covers
In 2019, alt-country band Mike and the Moonpies recorded a cover of the song while playing a show to mark the 45th anniversary of the "Hole in the Wall" bar that gave both Mike and the Moonpies and Fastball their start.

References

1998 singles
1998 songs
Fastball (band) songs
Hollywood Records singles
Music videos directed by McG
RPM Top Singles number-one singles
Songs based on actual events